Vincent Lyle "Cowboy" Wheeler (February 6, 1898 – September 20, 1939) was a professional football player who was an original member of the Green Bay Packers. He played for the Packers beginning in 1919, two years before the team joined the National Football League. His career ended after the 1923 season. Wheeler came out of Green Bay West High School and played five professional seasons from 1919-1923. He died from a heart attack in 1939.

References

Birth of a Team and a Legend
1919-1920 Green Bay Packers

1898 births
1939 deaths
American football wide receivers
Green Bay Packers players
Ripon Red Hawks football players
Sportspeople from Green Bay, Wisconsin
Players of American football from Wisconsin